The Sauer S 2100 ULT is a turbocharged four-stroke aircraft engine for homebuilt and ultralight aircraft.

Design and development
The engine is based on the Wasserboxer. It is extensively modified for aircraft use and all the parts are custom made. The engine is derived from the certified engines produced by the same manufacturer and used in several motorgliders and light aircraft.

Operational history
At least one Asso X is reported to be using this engine.

Applications
Asso X Jewel

Specifications (variant)

See also
Sauer Engines

References

External links

Sauer aircraft engines